Henry Bowen Anthony (April 1, 1815 – September 2, 1884) was a United States newspaperman and political figure. He served as editor and was later part owner of the Providence Journal. He was the 21st Governor of Rhode Island, serving between 1849 and 1851 as a member of the Whig Party. Near the end of the 1850s, he was elected to the Senate by the Rhode Island Legislature and was re-elected 4 times. He would be twice elected to the Senate's highest post as President pro tempore during the Grant administration, and served until his death in 1884.

Early life
The son of William Anthony and Mary Kennicut Greene, Anthony was born in Rhode Island. He attended Brown University, graduating in 1833 at the age of 18. After his graduation, he went to work as a broker in his brother's cotton products firm, sometimes residing in Savannah, Georgia. He later invested in the firm when his father died in 1845 and earned a substantial income from his investment.

Career
He became editor of the Providence Journal in 1838. In 1840, he was admitted into the partnership, the paper then being published by Knowles, Vose & Anthony until the death of Vose in 1848, when it was continued by Knowles & Anthony until 1863, when it became Knowles, Anthony & Danielson. Anthony also wrote poetry.

As editor of the Journal, Anthony was a conservative, supporting law and order, property requirements for voting, and restrictions on the political power of immigrants. In 1849, and again in 1850, he was elected governor of Rhode Island. As a Whig at the first election he had a majority of 1,556; at the second, fewer than 1,000 votes were cast against him. After declining a third election, he gave himself once more entirely to his editorial work.

In 1855, he traveled in Europe, sending letters with unfavorable observations back to the Journal. On returning, he joined the Know Nothing movement and used the Journal to back its American Party. In Rhode Island, the American Party merged into the Republican Party, and Anthony was elected to the United States Senate as an "American-Republican."

United States Senator

Anthony served as a Republican Senator from Rhode Island from March 4, 1859, until his death on September 2, 1884. Initially conciliatory toward the secessionists, he was a strong supporter of Abraham Lincoln's efforts to restore the Union during the American Civil War. After the war, in recognition of his support for the Union, he was elected a third class (i.e. honorary) companion of the District of Columbia Commandery of the Military Order of the Loyal Legion of the United States.

He was twice the chairman of the committee on printing, his practical knowledge of that subject enabling him to introduce many reforms in government printing. The Government Printing Office was formed during his tenure. He was at different times a member of the committees on claims, on naval affairs, on mines and mining, and on post offices and post roads. In the trial of Andrew Johnson, he voted for impeachment. He continued to contribute to the Providence Journal during his service in the Senate.

He served as the President pro tempore of the United States Senate from 1869 to 1873 and again briefly in 1875. He gave up that post when he was elected conference chairman in 1875. As chair, Anthony acted much like the later majority leaders, giving committee assignments to members of his party, calling up bills for debate, and often speaking for his party on the issues of the day. He was also the author of the "Anthony Rule," an early attempt to limit debate in the Senate in the days before cloture. He was known as the "Father of the Senate". Mindful of Anthony's age and infirmity, his colleagues accorded him special honor at the start of his fifth senatorial term in 1883:As the good old man stood with uplifted hand, every other member of the Senate rose, and stood until the obligation had been administered—a merited compliment to the Pater Senatus. No other man, save Thomas Hart Benton, had ever been sworn in five consecutive times as Senator.

Death and legacy
Anthony's funeral, which took place from the First Congregational Church in Providence on 6 September 1884 was the largest funeral ever known in Rhode Island.

Anthony bequeathed a portion of his library, known as the "Harris Collection of American Poetry," to Brown University. It consisted of about 6,000 volumes, mostly small books, many exceedingly rare. It was begun in the first half of the 19th century by Albert G. Greene, continued by Caleb Fiske Harris, and, after his death, completed by his kinsman Senator Anthony.

His name is engraved on a Civil War vintage artillery piece belonging to the Squantum Club in East Providence, Rhode Island. The artillery piece is reputed to have been the only gun from Battery A, 1st Rhode Island Light Artillery which did not fall into Confederate hands at the Battle of Bull Run. There is another nearly identical piece, known as the "Bull Run Gun", enshrined at the Rhode Island State House for which is claimed the same distinction.

Family 
In 1837 Anthony married Sarah Aborn Rhodes, daughter of Christopher Rhodes of Pawtuxet. She died in 1854.  They had no children, and he never remarried.

See also 

 List of United States Congress members who died in office (1790–1899)

References

External links 

 
 
 

1815 births
1884 deaths
American Quakers
Brown University alumni
Editors of Rhode Island newspapers
Governors of Rhode Island
People from Coventry, Rhode Island
People of Rhode Island in the American Civil War
Rhode Island Whigs
Rhode Island Republicans
Republican Party United States senators from Rhode Island
Burials at Swan Point Cemetery
Whig Party state governors of the United States
19th-century American politicians
Presidents pro tempore of the United States Senate
19th-century American newspaper editors
19th-century American newspaper publishers (people)
The Providence Journal people
Know-Nothing United States senators